Isa Marte Hussaini is a Nigerian professor of pharmacology and fellow of the Nigerian Academy of Science, inducted into the academy in 2013.
He specialized in cancer research and is currently exploring the use of local herbs for cancer therapy. His report to the Nigerian Academy of Science on the use of local herbs for Cancer therapy suggested that herbal plants are more efficacious than the current drugs used in cancer treatments.
In May 2015, he presented a paper entitled: “The mining of Nigerian medicinal plants for cancer therapy” in Abuja at the induction of Fellows of the Nigeria Academy of Science where he stated the predictions of the International Agency for Research on Cancer that annual global new cases of cancers are expected to rise from 11 million to 16 million by 2020, with 70 per cent of them coming from developing countries.

In April 2014, he contested for the seat of Vice Chancellor of the University of Maiduguri but lost the seat to Professor Ibrahim Abubakar Njodi, the incumbent VC of the university.

Background

Marte was born in Maiduguri, the capital of Borno State, North-Eastern Nigeria. He attended Yerwa Central Primary School Maiduguri, before he attended Yerwa Government Secondary School Maiduguri, where he obtained the West African School Certificate in 1975. He obtained a bachelor's degree in Pharmacy from Ahmadu Bello University, Zaria and a master's degree in pharmacology from Chelsea College, University of London in 1983 after he completed the compulsory one year National Youth Service at General Hospital Kontogora, Niger State in 1981.
He later received a doctorate degree (Ph.D.) in pharmacology from King's College London in 1987 and in 1997, he received a MBA from Averett University, a private non-profit college in Danville, Virginia, US, in south-central Virginia.

Career

He joined the Department of Pharmacology, College of Medical Sciences, University of Maiduguri in 1981 but left in 1982 for a Graduate Program at Chelsea College University of London. After he received  doctorate degree (Ph.D.) in Pharmacology from King's College London in 1987, he returned to Nigeria to join the services of  Ahmadu Bello University, where he was appointed a senior lecturer in 1991.
 He left the university to join the National Institute for Pharmaceutical Development (NIPRD), Abuja as chief research fellow and was later appointed head of Department of Pharmaceutics and Pharmaceutical Technology.

In 1993, he joined the University of Virginia School of Medicine as a research associate at the Department of Pathology. He served in that capacity for two years and in 1995, he was appointed professor of research. He served in that capacity for five years and in 2004, he was appointed as visiting professor, Department of Pharmacology and Clinical Pharmacy, ABU Zaria.

In 2010, he was appointed as dean of pharmacy and professor of pharmacology, Faculty of Pharmacy, University of Maiduguri, a position he held till 2014. In 2013, he was elected as fellow of the Nigerian Academy of Science, the same year he was appointed as visiting professor at the Department of Pathology, University of Virginia.
He is currently the national vice president of Ahmadu Bello University Alumni Association.

Recognition

In November 2015, he became a Fellow of the Nigerian Academy of Pharmacy.

Marte is a scientist who focuses on the use of herbal plants in the treatment of cancer. To present his contributions to cancer research, he was hosted by Professor Louise Serpell through the Sussex Nigerian Society, University of Sussex in an event titled Meet the Nigerian Scientist. 
On 12 February 2016, at the university's Genome Damage and Stability Centre, he presented a lecture, titled "Exploitation of medicinal plant compounds in the search for novel cancer therapeutic agents". In attendance was Michael Farthing, the vice-chancellor of the University of Sussex and the Nigerian acting high commissioner in London, Adah Simon Ogah.

Membership
Member, Society for Neuroscience
Member, American Association for Cancer Research (AACR)
Member, Pharmacists Council of Nigeria

References

1956 births
Living people
Alumni of King's College London
Nigerian educational theorists
Academic staff of the University of Maiduguri
Nigerian pharmacologists
University of Virginia School of Medicine faculty
Academic staff of Ahmadu Bello University
Fellows of the African Academy of Sciences